Andrew Bruno Teixeira Monteiro  (born 9 January 1992) is a Brazilian footballer who plays for C.D. Aves as a forward.

Football career
On 27 July 2013, Monteiro made his professional debut with Aves in a 2013–14 Taça da Liga match against Tondela.

References

External links

Stats and profile at LPFP 

1992 births
Living people
Brazilian footballers
Coritiba Foot Ball Club players
Brazilian expatriates in Portugal
Expatriate footballers in Portugal
Association football forwards
Liga Portugal 2 players
C.D. Aves players
Sportspeople from Belém